World Development Trophy may refer to:
 ISU World Development Trophy (figure skating)
 ISU World Development Trophy Short Track Speed Skating